Liberty Township is one of thirteen townships in Grant County, Indiana, United States. As of the 2010 census, its population was 1,028 and it contained 428 housing units.

Geography
The streams of Little Creek and Little Deer Creek run through this township.

Cities and towns
 Marion (southwest edge)

Unincorporated towns
 Hackleman
 Radley
 Weaver
(This list is based on USGS data and may include former settlements.)

Adjacent townships
 Franklin Township (north)
 Mill Township (northeast)
 Fairmount Township (east)
 Boone Township, Madison County (south)
 Duck Creek Township, Madison County (southwest)
 Green Township (west)
 Sims Township (northwest)

Major highways

References
 
 United States Census Bureau cartographic boundary files

External links
 Indiana Township Association
 United Township Association of Indiana

Townships in Grant County, Indiana
Townships in Indiana